The 1997–98 Australia Tri-Nation Series (more commonly known as the 1997–98 Carlton and United Series) was a One Day International (ODI) cricket tri-series where Australia played host to New Zealand and South Africa. Australia and South Africa reached the Finals, which Australia won 2–1.

Squads

Points table

Result summary

Match 1: Australia vs. South Africa

Match 2: New Zealand vs. South Africa

Match 3: Australia vs. New Zealand

4th match: Australia vs. South Africa

5th match: New Zealand vs. South Africa

6th match: Australia vs. New Zealand

7th match: New Zealand vs. South Africa

8th match: Australia vs. South Africa

9th match: Australia vs. New Zealand

10th match: New Zealand vs. South Africa

11th match: Australia vs. South Africa

12th match: Australia vs. New Zealand

Final series
Australia won the best of three final series against South Africa 2–1.

1st Final: Australia vs. South Africa

2nd Final: Australia vs. South Africa

3rd Final: Australia vs. South Africa

External links
 Series home at Cricinfo

References

Australian Tri-Series
1997 in Australian cricket
1997 in cricket
1997–98 Australian cricket season
1998 in Australian cricket
1998 in cricket
International cricket competitions from 1997–98 to 2000
1997–98
1997–98